HD 2638 b is a planet of the star HD 2638. It is a typical "hot Jupiter", a planet that orbits its parent star in a very tight "torch orbit". The distance to the star is less than 1/20 Earth's distance from the Sun. One orbital revolution lasts only about three and half days.

References

External links
 SIMBAD entry
 The Extrasolar Planets Encyclopaedia entry

Cetus (constellation)
Exoplanets discovered in 2005
Giant planets
Hot Jupiters
Exoplanets detected by radial velocity